Kovvur is a town in East Godavari district of the Indian state of Andhra Pradesh. It is a municipality and the mandal headquarters of Kovvur mandal in Kovvur revenue division.

Etymology 
This Town was earlier referred as Govur.
According to Brahma Puranam, Kovvur(Govuru) is considered as the place of Gautama Maharishi's Ashramam. He did farming in the surrounding regions to maintain his Ashramam. Gautama Maharishi once he accidentally kills a cow, grazing in his paddy field, by throwing a darbha (sharp, pointed grass). Gautama becomes upset with this incident and offers a great tapas for Lord Shiva in Brahmagiri mountains. The god, pleased by his tapas, wipes away his sin and allows Ganga to flow in his farm to purify the place (Kovvur). The river thus originated is called "Godavari" which means "originated due to killing a cow". It is also called as "Gautami" in appreciation to the effort of the maharishi in bringing Godavari to earth. Gautama maharishi accidentally kills a cow in his farm and to clear out his sin, he offers a great tapas near Bhrahmagiri parvatas near Triambakam in Maharashtra. Lord Shiva pleased with his tapas allows Ganga to sanctify the region. 

Kovvuru is a transformed name of Govuru which originated from the above story. The names of various places around Kovvuru highlight this fact. It is believed that Gautama established a Vijneswara temple in the South and a Kumaraswami temple in the North of his Ashrama. These are currently known as Vijjeswaram and Kumaradevam. The place where Gautama ploughed the farm was Arikirevula which is transformed to Arikirevu. Vadapalli, Munikoodali, Brahmanagudem were the places of rishis. The place where Ahalya lived was called Tougimi which is currently called Togummi. The place where the cow died was Chavugallu which is currently called Chagallu.

Kovvuru Goshpada Kshetram is very sacred place and a must visit place during pushkaras.

Geography 

Kovvur Is The Most Peaceful Town In The District And Devotional Town, "Goshpada Kshetram" Very Well Known Tourist Place Where Godavari Pushkaralu Takes Place.

Demographics 

 India census, Kovvur had a population of 39,193. Males constitute 50% of the population and females 50%. Kovvur has an average literacy rate of 70%, higher than the national average of 59.5%: male literacy is 74%, and female literacy is 66%. In Kovvur, 11% of the population is under 6 years of age.

Governance 
Civic administration

Kovvur municipality was formed in the year 1965.

Transport 
The transport is mainly supported by the presence of bridges across Godavari River such as, the Godavari Bridge, which is the second longest railroad bridge in Asia; and the Godavari Arch Bridge, commissioned on 14 March 1997 for Howrah–Chennai main line. While, the Old Godavari Bridge (The Havelock Bridge) was the earliest of all, built in 1897 and was decommissioned in 1997.

Roadways 
The Andhra Pradesh State Road Transport Corporation operates bus services from Kovvur bus station The depot was reopened in  2015.

Railways 
 is one of the fourteen D–category stations in the Vijayawada railway division of South Central Railway zone. Kovvur will become a Potential Railway junction Between both Telugu States After Completion of Kovvur-Bhadrachalam road Railway line.

Airways
Rajahmundry Airport is the nearest airport located 15km away from town.

Education
The primary and secondary school education is imparted by government, aided and private schools, under the School Education Department of the state. The medium of instruction followed by different schools are English, Telugu.There Are Many Famous Institutions Like ABN&PRR College Of Sciences, Sanskrit colleges and Many Other Private Institutions.

References 

Cities and towns in East Godavari district
Mandal headquarters in East Godavari district